The Human Body may refer to:

 The human body, the entire structure of a human being

Music
 The Human Body (EP), a 2005 EP by The Electric Soft Parade
 The Human Body (TV series), a 1998 BBC One television series
"The Human Body", song by Pylon from Gyrate (1980)
"The Human Body", song by Prince from Emancipation (1996)

Film
The Human Body (1945 film)
The Human Body (2001 film)